The list of ship launches in 1720 includes a chronological list of some ships launched in 1720.


References

1720
Ship launches